Stela may refer to:

Latinised singular stela of stele, a kind of stone monument
Satellite Television Extension and Localism Act of 2010
 Stela (video game), a 2019 Canadian game
 Stela (film), a 1990 Croatian film
 Stela (name), a Romanian feminine given name

See also
 Stella (disambiguation)